Mursaruiyeh (also Romanized as Mūrsārū’īyeh; also known as Marsārū’īyeh and Morsārū’īyeh) is a village in Bezenjan Rural District, in the Central District of Baft County, Kerman Province, Iran. At the 2006 census, its population was 42, in 11 families.

References 

Populated places in Baft County